Ridgeville is a community within the town of Pelham, Ontario, in Canada.  It borders the western limit of Fonthill.  It derives its name from its location on the south western ridge of the Fonthill Kame.  It has a post office, a rural mail route named Ridgeville, a small number of shops found along Canboro Road, including a bakery, chocolate shop and specialty home and bath shops, the local high school, Gwennol Organic Blueberry Farm and the Ridge Berry Farm Tea Room.

Climate 
The climate is warm-summer humid continental (Köppen: Dfb). The community serves as the basis for Pelham's normals.

References

External links
Ridgeville at Geographical Names of Canada

Neighbourhoods in Pelham, Ontario